Woodrow Sauldsberry Jr. (July 11, 1934 – September 3, 2007) was an American basketball player. He was the NBA's Rookie of the Year in 1958 and in 1966 he won the NBA championship as a member of the Boston Celtics.

Early life
Sauldsberry was born in Winnsboro, Louisiana and graduated from Compton Union High School, where he was the star of his basketball team, and then went on to attend Texas Southern University.

Professional career
Following his college career, Sauldsberry was part of the Harlem Globetrotters for two years. In 1957 he was drafted by the Philadelphia Warriors in the eight round with the 60th overall pick. After his first season, he was named the league's Rookie of the Year — the second African American ever to win the award and becoming the lowest overall draft pick ever to win the award, a record he still holds. On January 2, 1959, he scored a career high 41 points against the Syracuse Nationals. The same month, he was selected to play in the NBA All-Star Game.

On October 17, 1961, Sauldsberry was among seven players—the others being Bill Russell, Al Butler, Sam Jones, K. C. Jones, Tom Sanders, and Cleo Hill— to refuse to play in an exhibition basketball game over alleged discrimination. The five members of the Boston Celtics said that a hotel coffee shop denied them service, after which they told Coach Red Auerbach they wanted to return to Boston. Sauldsberry and Hill joined the five in refusing to play the game.

In November 1961, Sauldsberry was traded to the Chicago Packers along with Joe Graboski, Si Green and Fred LaCour for Barney Cable, Archie Dees and Ralph Davis.

In January 1963, Sauldsberry was traded back to the Hawks for Barney Cable. On March 13, he was suspended by the Hawks for a week following a dispute with head coach Harry Gallatin. He did not return to the team and was left of its playoff roster. In June 1963, he was waived by the Hawks.

After two years away from the NBA, Sauldsberry worked out for the Boston Celtics during the 1965 pre-season before playing for the New Haven Elms in the Eastern League. In November 1965, he signed with the Celtics for the season. After the NBA refused to accept the contract, Sauldsberry filed a class action suit against J. Walter Kennedy and all the NBA teams, except the Celtics, for a conspiracy to keep him out of the league. In December, the NBA approved the contract when the Celtics and Sauldsberry agreed to conditions laid down to them and the suit was officially dropped in January 1966. He played his last NBA game on March 1, 1966, missing the rest of the regular season and playoffs due to a back injury.

Later life
Sometime in the late 90s, Sauldsberry was diagnosed with diabetes and had to have his leg amputated.

He died September 3, 2007, aged 73 in Baltimore, Maryland. An article by Dan Klores alleges that when Sauldsberry died, "he was broke, alone and on the verge of losing his left leg to diabetes, which took his right."

NBA career statistics

Regular season

Playoffs

References

External links
 Brodie, James Michael "Life and Basketball: The Redemption of Woody Sauldsberry" Baltimore City Paper, March 28, 2001
 Woody Sauldsberry statistics provided by BasketballReference.com
 Fond Farewell – National Basketball Retired Players Association.

1934 births
2007 deaths
African-American basketball players
American men's basketball players
Basketball players from Louisiana
Boston Celtics players
Centers (basketball)
Chicago Packers players
Chicago Zephyrs players
Compton High School alumni
Harlem Globetrotters players
National Basketball Association All-Stars
New Haven Elms players
People from Winnsboro, Louisiana
Philadelphia Warriors draft picks
Philadelphia Warriors players
Power forwards (basketball)
St. Louis Hawks players
Texas Southern Tigers men's basketball players
20th-century African-American sportspeople
21st-century African-American people